A referendum on the status of Southern Rhodesia was held in the colony on 27 October 1922. Voters, almost all of them White, were given the options of establishing responsible government or joining the Union of South Africa. After 59% voted in favour of responsible government, it was officially granted on 1 October 1923.

Background
The referendum arose after the 1920 Legislative Council elections resulted in a majority which favoured immediate moves towards establishing responsible government within the colony. Immediately after the election, the Legislative Council passed a resolution requesting the British Government to inaugurate responsible government, and the United Kingdom's response was establishing a Commission under The 1st Earl Buxton, a former Liberal minister and former Governor-General of South Africa.

The Buxton Commission reported in 1921 that the Colony was ready for responsible government and that a referendum should be held to confirm it. A delegation was sent from the Legislative Council to negotiate with the Colonial Office on the form of the constitution. The delegation comprised Sir Charles Coghlan, W. M. Leggate, John McChlery, R. A. Fletcher, and Sir Francis Newton. At the 1920 election there had been three schools of opinion in Southern Rhodesia, one favouring responsible government inside Southern Rhodesia, one favouring a continuation of rule through the British South Africa Company, and the third believing that the best solution would be to seek membership of the Union of South Africa. The British South Africa Company option dropped out of consideration, but the Buxton Commission had said that its recommendations should not preclude consideration of joining South Africa if this was favoured by voters.

The Southern Rhodesians did petition the Colonial Office to inquire what circumstances the Union of South Africa would admit them, as this option had received some support (especially in Matabeleland) at the election. Representatives of the Southern Rhodesian administration visited Cape Town to confer with Jan Smuts, who after some delay was willing to offer terms he considered reasonable and which were also acceptable to the United Kingdom government. In accordance with the wishes of Winston Churchill (the Secretary of State for the Colonies in London), the Southern Rhodesians decided to invite the electorate to make the decision. Although they did not try to interfere in the referendum, opinion among the United Kingdom government, the South African government and the British South Africa Company favoured the union option.

Arrangements
The election used the existing Legislative Council electoral roll and votes were counted in the electoral districts used for the Legislative Council elections. However, there was one minor change, with voters entitled to cast their votes in whichever district they wanted, regardless of where they were registered.

Results
All but one of the electoral districts supported responsible government and rejected Union with South Africa. The one district to support a Union with South Africa was Marandellas, and this was by a slim margin.

By district

References

Southern Rhodesia
Referendums in Zimbabwe
Government referendum
Constitutional referendums in Zimbabwe